Ouleye Dieye (born 9 January 1986) is a Senegalese footballer who plays for Sirènes Grand Yoff and the Senegal national team.

She played for Senegal at the 2012 African Women's Championship.

References

1986 births
Living people
Senegalese women's footballers
Senegal women's international footballers
Women's association football goalkeepers